Portland Road may refer to:

Australia
Portland Road, Queensland, a town in the Shire of Cook

United Kingdom
Edgbaston Foundation Ground, a cricket ground located on Portland Road, Birmingham, and sometimes referred to as such
Portland Road, Notting Hill, a road in the London Borough of Kensington and Chelsea
A section of the A215 road in Norwood, south London
Portland Roads, England